Leonard Stuart Darling (14 August 1909 – 24 June 1992) was an Australian cricketer who played in 12 Test matches from 1933 to 1937.

Darling once told a story of fielding on the boundary at the Sydney Cricket Ground and positioning himself to catch a big hit from Don Bradman. While the ball was still in the air, according to Darling, the crowd yelled at him to drop the catch. This occurred in Bradman's last innings for New South Wales in 1934. Darling did in fact take the catch to end Bradman's innings. Bradman was out for 128, with him hitting three sixes in the over, and getting caught while trying to hit his fourth.

Len Darling married his wife Phyllis ("Bobby") in 1937. They had two daughters. He served in the Australian Army with the 24th Australian Anti-Aircraft Battery in World War II.

References

External links
 

1909 births
1992 deaths
Australia Test cricketers
Victoria cricketers
Melbourne Cricket Club cricketers
Australian cricketers
Cricketers from Melbourne
People educated at Trinity Grammar School, Kew
Australian Army personnel of World War II
Australian Army soldiers
People from South Yarra, Victoria
Military personnel from Melbourne